Joel Whist is a mechanical effects supervisor. Known for his films, War for the Planet of the Apes, The BFG, Godzilla and Batman v Superman: Dawn of Justice, he was nominated for Academy Award for Best Visual Effects for War for the Planet of the Apes.

References

External links

Visual effects supervisors
Living people
Year of birth missing (living people)
Place of birth missing (living people)